LaCurtis Jones (born June 23, 1972) is a former American football linebacker. He played for the Tampa Bay Buccaneers in 1996.

References

1972 births
Living people
American football linebackers
Baylor Bears football players
Tampa Bay Buccaneers players
Montreal Alouettes players